Thorium(IV) nitrate is a chemical compound, a salt of thorium and nitric acid with the formula Th(NO3)4. A white solid in its anhydrous form, it can form tetra- and pentahydrates. As a salt of thorium it is weakly radioactive.

Preparation
Thorium(IV) nitrate hydrate can be prepared by the reaction of thorium(IV) hydroxide and nitric acid:
 Th(OH)4 + 4 HNO3 +  3 H2O → Th(NO3)4•5H2O
Different hydrates are produced by crystallizing in different conditions. When a solution is very dilute, the nitrate is hydrolysed. Although various hydrates have been reported over the years, and some suppliers even claim to stock them, only the tetrahydrate and pentahydrate actually exist. What is called a hexahydrate, crystallized from a neutral solution, is probably a basic salt.

The pentahydrate is the most common form. It is crystallized from dilute nitric acid solution.

The tetrahydrate, Th(NO3)4•4H2O is formed by crystallizing from a stronger nitric acid solution. Concentrations of nitric acid from 4 to 59% result in the tetrahydrate forming. The thorium atom has 12-coordination, with four bidentate nitrate groups and four water molecules attached to each thorium atom.

To obtain the anhydrous thorium(IV) nitrate, thermal decomposition of Th(NO3)4·2N2O5 is required. The decomposition occurs at 150-160 °C.

Properties
Anhydrous thorium nitrate is a white substance.  It is covalently bound with low melting point of 55 °C.

The pentahydrate Th(NO3)4•5H2O crystallizes with clear colourless crystals in the orthorhombic system.  The unit cell size is a=11.191 b=22.889 c=10.579 Å. Each thorium atom is connected twice to each of four bidentate nitrate groups, and to three water molecules via their oxygen atoms. In total the thorium is eleven-coordinated. There are also two other water molecules in the crystal structure. The water is hydrogen bonded to other water, or to nitrate groups. The density is 2.80 g/cm3. Vapour pressure of the pentahydrate at 298K is 0.7 torr, and increases to 1.2 torr at 315K, and at 341K it is up to 10.7 torr. At 298.15K the heat capacity is about 114.92 calK−1mol−1. This heat capacity shrinks greatly at cryogenic temperatures. Entropy of formation of thorium nitrate pentahydrate at 298.15K is −547.0 calK−1mol−1. The standard Gibbs energy of formation is −556.1 kcalmol−1.

Thorium nitrate can dissolve in several different organic solvents including alcohols, ketones, esters and ethers. This can be used to separate different metals such as the lanthanides. With ammonium nitrate in the aqueous phase, thorium nitrate prefers the organic liquid, and the lanthanides stay with the water.

Thorium nitrate dissolved in water lowers it freezing point. The maximum freezing point depression is −37 °C with a concentration of 2.9 mol/kg.

At 25° a saturated solution of thorium nitrate contains 4.013 moles per liter. At this concentration the vapour pressure of water in the solution is 1745.2 Pascals, compared to 3167.2 Pa for pure water.

Reactions
When thorium nitrate pentahydrate is heated, nitrates with less water are produced, however the compounds also lose some nitrate. At 140 °C a basic nitrate, ThO(NO3)2 is produced. When strongly heated thorium dioxide is produced.

A polymeric peroxynitrate is precipitated when hydrogen peroxide combines with thorium nitrate in solution with dilute nitric acid. Its formula is Th6(OO)10(NO3)4 •10H2O.

The hydrolysis of thorium nitrate solutions produces basic nitrates Th2(OH)4(NO3)4•H2O and Th2(OH)2(NO3)6•8H2O. In crystals of Th2(OH)2(NO3).6•8H2O a pair of thorium atoms are connected by two bridging oxygen atoms. Each thorium atom is surrounded by three bidentate nitrate groups and three water molecules, bringing the coordination number to 11.

When oxalic acid is added to a thorium nitrate solution, insoluble thorium oxalate precipitates. Other organic acids added to thorium nitrate solution produce precipitates of organic salts with citric acid; basic salts, such as tartaric acid, adipic acid, malic acid, gluconic acid, phenylacetic acid, valeric acid. Other precipitates are also formed from sebacic acid and azelaic acid

Double salts
Hexanitratothorates with the generic formula M2Th(NO3)6 or MTh(NO3)6•8H2O are made by mixing other metal nitrates with thorium nitrate in dilute nitric acid solution. M can be Mg, Mn, Co, Ni, or Zn. M can be Cs, (NO)+ or (NO2)+. Crystals the divalent metal thorium hexanitrate octahydrate have a monoclinic form with similar unit cell dimensions: β=97°, a=9.08 b=8.75-8 c=12.61-3.
Pentanitratothorates with the generic formula MTh(NO3)5•H2O are known for M being Na or K.

K3Th(NO3)7 and K3H3Th(NO3)10•4H2O are also known

Complexed salts
Thorium nitrate also crystallizes with other ligands and organic solvates including ethylene glycol diethyl ether, tri(n‐butyl)phosphate, butylamine, dimethylamine, trimethylphosphine oxide.

References

Thorium compounds
Nitrates
Deliquescent substances